Neogastromyzon is a genus of gastromyzontid loaches which are only found in streams and rivers in Borneo.

Species
This genus currently contains six known species:
 Neogastromyzon brunei H. H. Tan, 2006
 Neogastromyzon chini H. H. Tan, 2006
 Neogastromyzon crassiobex H. H. Tan, 2006
 Neogastromyzon kottelati H. H. Tan, 2006
 Neogastromyzon nieuwenhuisii Popta, 1905
 Neogastromyzon pauciradiatus (Inger & P. K. Chin, 1961)

References

Gastromyzontidae
Fish of Asia